Brutal Knights are a Canadian punk band formed in 2006 in Toronto, Ontario. In 2010, the band has been described as "the most energetic revivalist hardcore act" in Toronto. Brutal Knights are also known for their humorous lyrics, written by vocalist Nick Flanagan. Flanagan is also a comedian, and sometimes performs stand-up at their shows. According to Flanagan, guitarist Jon Sharron writes most of the music.

Brutal Knights, along with Fucked Up, Career Suicide, and Terminal State, were part of a burgeoning hardcore punk scene in Toronto. In 2006 they were voted "Best Punk Band" by Toronto's Now Magazine.

The Brutal Knights played their final show in December 2010, in Montreal, Quebec.

Discography

Albums
 Blown 2 Completion (LP/CD, 2010, Deranged)
 Living By Yourself (LP/CD, 2008, Deranged / P. Trash)
 Feast of Shame (CD, 2007, Deranged)
 The Pleasure Is All Thine (LP/CD, 2006, Deranged)

Singles and EPs
 Total Rebellion (EP, 2009, P. Trash Records)
 My Life, My Fault (EP, 7", 2008, Spin the Bottle)
 "Breakdown" (7", 2007, Perpetrator)
 Life Ain't Cool (EP, 7", 2007, Riff Raff)
 Not Fun (EP, 7", 2007, Deranged)
 Terrible Evenings (EP, 7", 2007, P. Trash)
 "T.B.S.L. Baby", Split (with Western Dark) (7", 2005, Classic Bar)

References

External links
 Brutal Knights on Myspace
 Brutal Knights at CBC Radio 3

Musical groups established in 2006
Musical groups from Toronto
Canadian hardcore punk groups
Musical groups disestablished in 2010
2006 establishments in Ontario
2010 disestablishments in Ontario